Rally Fusion: Race of Champions is a racing game released for the Sony PlayStation 2 and Xbox consoles in 2002. It was developed by Climax Brighton and published by Activision.

Gameplay 
The game was based on the Race of Champions held in Gran Canaria, it featured 19 different cars such as the Lancia 037, Peugeot 306 Maxi and the ROC buggy. 19 different tracks were used but many never featured in the real race of champions. There was going to be a port for the Nintendo GameCube but it was ultimately cancelled.

Reviews 
GameRankings: 74.78%
Official PlayStation Magazine UK: 6/10
 IGN: 8.0/10

See also
Michelin Rally Masters: Race of Champions

References

 GameFAQs
 

2002 video games
Activision games
GameCube games
Off-road racing video games
PlayStation 2 games
Race of Champions
Racing video games
Rally racing video games
Video games developed in the United Kingdom
Xbox games